In mathematics, Karamata's inequality, named after Jovan Karamata, also known as the majorization inequality, is a theorem in elementary algebra for convex and concave real-valued functions, defined on an interval of the real line. It generalizes the discrete form of Jensen's inequality, and generalizes in turn to the concept of Schur-convex functions.

Statement of the inequality

Here majorization means that  and  satisfies

and we have the inequalities

and the equality

If   is a strictly convex function, then the inequality holds with equality if and only if we have  for all .

Remarks

 The inequality is reversed if   is concave, since in this case the function   is convex.

Example
The finite form of Jensen's inequality is a special case of this result. Consider the real numbers  and let 

denote their arithmetic mean. By Karamata's inequality for the convex function ,

 

Dividing by  gives Jensen's inequality. The sign is reversed if   is concave.

Proof of the inequality

If  for all , then the inequality holds with equality, hence we may assume in the following that  for at least one .

Hence we may assume that  for all .

It is a property of convex functions that for two numbers  in the interval  the slope

This implies that

for all . Define  and 

for all . Hence,

which proves Karamata's inequality.

Then .

If the convex function   is non-decreasing, then .

If the function   is strictly convex and non-decreasing, then . It only remains to discuss the case .

References

External links
An explanation of Karamata's inequality and majorization theory can be found here.

Inequalities
Convex analysis
Articles containing proofs